General Bingham may refer to:

Cecil Edward Bingham (1861–1934), British Army major general
Francis Richard Bingham (1863–1935), British Army major general
George Bingham, 3rd Earl of Lucan (1800–1888), British Army general
George Bingham, 5th Earl of Lucan (1860–1949), British Army brigadier general
Gwen Bingham (born 1959), U.S. Army lieutenant general
Henry H. Bingham (1841–1912), Union Army brevet brigadier general